Hallangiidae is a family of Acoela. It contains 2 species in 2 genera.

Genera
There are two genera in the family Hallangiidae.
Aechmalotus Beklemischev, 1915
Hallangia  Westblad, 1946

Species
There are two species in the family Hallangiidae.

Notes

References

Acoelomorphs